Judy Shaw (born in Stillwater, Oklahoma) is an Inductee of the Women in Technology International Hall of Fame. She has retired from Texas Instruments where she had a role in semiconductor process technology. She has since been involved in Christian charities Real Options for Women in Plano, Texas and Shiloh Place McKinney in McKinney, Texas.

References 

Texas Instruments people
American women computer scientists
American computer scientists
People from Stillwater, Oklahoma
Year of birth missing (living people)
Living people
21st-century American women